The 2020–21 Penn State Nittany Lions women's Hockey Team represented Penn State University in CHA women's ice hockey during the 2019-20 NCAA Division I women's ice hockey season. The season was Jeff Kampersall's third as head coach, and the team has established itself as a competitive program under his tutelage. The Nittany Lions were challenged by the season ending injury to goaltender, Jenna Brenneman, during the first weekend of play. Brenneman had the eighth best Goals Asainst Average in the nation in 2018–19. In her absence, junior Chantal Burke emerged as one of the nation's best netminders, assisted by a strong corps of defenders, including freshman Mallory Uihlein, a promising player for Team USA.

Offseason 

Natalie Heising was invited to the 2019 USA Hockey Women's National Festival In Lake Placid, in August. It was Heisings second consecutive invitation.

Standings

Recruiting
.

Roster

2019–20 Nittany Lions

Schedule

|-
!colspan=12 style=""| Regular Season

|-
!colspan=12 style=""| CHA Tournament

Awards and honors

Junior goaltender Chantal Burke was named the CHA All-Conference First Team amassing seven shutouts in 32 games played a .937 Goals Against Average and 1.69 Goals per game, each category among the top ten in the nation.

Sophomore defender Izzy Heminger was named to the All-Conference Second Team, and defender Mallory Uihlen was named to the All-Rookie Team.

Following the CHA Tournament, Junior Forward Natalie Heising was named to the All-Tournament team with a hat trick in the quarterfinal game against RIT.

References

Penn State
Penn State women's ice hockey seasons